The West Sussex County Council election, 2009 were elections to West Sussex County Council which took place on 4 June 2009, having been delayed from 7 May, in order to coincide with elections to the European Parliament.

The elections saw the Conservative Party retain overall control, having done so since 1997.  On this occasion they gained two seats and saw their vote share increase by just over 5%.   The Liberal Democrats strengthened their position as the main opposition party, gaining a net total of four seats, despite their own share of the vote falling by nearly 4%. The Labour Party lost five of the seven seats they had held before the election, and saw their vote fall by nearly 10%, broadly in line with their national decline. This decline saw the party fall to fourth place in the county in terms of the popular vote, being replaced in third by the UK Independence Party, who are likely to have benefited by voting being held alongside the European Parliament elections.

Summary

|}

Results by division
The elections were the first to be fought on new electoral divisions as recommended by the Boundary Committee for England following a review, carried out at the request of West Sussex County Council. The new arrangement of 71 single-member divisions replaced the 70 seats that were contested across 62 divisions in 2005. The recommendations were accepted by the Electoral Commission in February 2009, who implemented the legal order authorising the change and allowing the new divisions to be used in these elections on 6 March 2009.

Adur

Arun

Chichester

Crawley

Horsham

Mid Sussex

Worthing

References

External links
West Sussex County Council

2009 English local elections
2009
2000s in West Sussex